Ádám Csilus (born 8 May 1995 in Ócsa) is a Hungarian football player who currently plays for Nyíregyháza Spartacus FC.

He is the twin brother of Tamás Csilus, who is also a footballer.

Club statistics

Updated to games played as of 2 December 2014.

References
 MLSZ 
 

1995 births
Living people
People from Ócsa
Hungarian footballers
Association football defenders
Nemzeti Bajnokság I players
Nemzeti Bajnokság II players
Ferencvárosi TC footballers
Soroksár SC players
Puskás Akadémia FC players
Nyíregyháza Spartacus FC players
Csákvári TK players
Sportspeople from Pest County
21st-century Hungarian people